Balantidiidae is a biological family of chromists in the phylum Ciliophora. The family name comes from the type genus Balantidium.

Distribution 
The Balantidium coli species has a worldwide distribution, but is more frequent in subtropical and temperate climates. The medical condition balantidiasis is particularly prevalent where poor hygiene and undernourishment weaken a population coincide with living in close contact with pigs, the main reservoir for the species.

References 

Ciliate families